German DJ Robin Schulz has released four studio albums, two DJ mixes, 36 singles and one promotional single. Schulz achieved his worldwide breakthrough with his remix of Mr. Probz's "Waves" (2014), which reached the top ten of the charts in over ten countries, while further peaking within the top ten in various other. It was also certified—among others—Platinum in both the United Kingdom and the United States. While the disc jockey's follow-up recording, "Prayer in C" (2014), was met with similar commercial acclaim, two fellow singles from his debut studio album Prayer (2015) were released, including a collaboration with Jasmine Thompson.

Sugar (2015), Schulz's second record, received a Gold certification in Germany and was, like Prayer, moderately successful on charts. Sugar incorporated various featurings; "Headlights" and "Sugar" with Ilsey and Francesco Yates, respectively, went on to become chart successes in Europe, with the latter one achieving a Gold certification delivered by United States' RIAA.

Studio albums

DJ mixes

Singles

As lead artist

Promotional singles

Remixes

Notes

References

Discographies of German artists
House music discographies